José María Larrauri Lafuente (4 March 1918 – 9 December 2008) was a Spanish Bishop of the Roman Catholic Church. At the time of his death, aged 90, he was one of the oldest bishops in the Church and one of oldest bishops of Spain.

Lafuente was born in Vitoria, Spain and was ordained a priest on 29 June 1948 in Vitoria, Spain. He was appointed Auxiliary bishop of Archdiocese of Pamplona on 21 September 1970, along with the Titular Bishop of Aufinium, and was ordained a bishop on 4 November 1970. On 16 February 1979 Legarreta was appointed to the Vitoria Diocese and would remain there until his retirement on 8 September 1995.

References

External links
Catholic Hierarchy 
Vitoria Diocese Site 
José María Larrauri Lafuente's obituary 

1918 births
2008 deaths
20th-century Roman Catholic bishops in Spain